"My Heart's Divided" is the third single from freestyle singer Shannon's debut album Let the Music Play.

Track listing

US 12" Single

Charts

References

1984 singles
Shannon (singer) songs
Song recordings produced by Chris Barbosa
Songs written by Chris Barbosa
Mirage Records singles
1984 songs